Suffocation is the fifth studio album by American death metal band Suffocation. It was released in 2006 through Relapse Records. This is the first album to feature Derek Boyer as bassist. The song "Prelude to Repulsion" is a re-recording of the track of the same name on Breeding the Spawn.

A music video for "Abomination Reborn" was produced.

Track listing
All songs written & arranged by Suffocation.

Personnel
 Frank Mullen – vocals
 Terrance Hobbs – lead guitar
 Guy Marchais – rhythm guitar
 Derek Boyer – bass
 Mike Smith – drums

References

Suffocation (band) albums
2006 albums
Relapse Records albums